Frederick William Barrett (10 January 1883 – 3 March 1931) was a British stoker. After having served as a stoker on several ships, on 6 April 1912, he was hired on board the RMS Titanic as lead stoker. On April 15, 1912, while the ship was sinking, Barrett boarded lifeboat No. 13 and took command of it, thus surviving the disaster. He later testified before commissions of inquiry into the sinking of the ship and continued to work in the navy until the 1920s. In 1923, after losing his wife Mary Anne Jones, he remained in Liverpool and worked ashore as a logger.

He died of pulmonary tuberculosis in 1931.

Biography

Youth and career 
Frederick William Barrett was born on 10 January 1883 in Bootle, near Liverpool. He was the only surviving child of Henry Charles Barrett (1862-1909), a Devon workman, and Mary Barrett (née Morgan) (1864-?) of Birkenhead. On 4 October of the same year, he was baptized in St. John's Church in Bootle. Little is known about his youth, but the census of 1891 indicates that he was a wheelwright and his father a woodworker.

Barrett decided to turn to the sea when he discovered that his wife was unfaithful. The date of his first trip to sea is not certain. In 1903, he joined the Cunard Line aboard the RMS Campania as a stoker. In 1904, he entered the service of the Allan Line by serving aboard the SS Parisian and then the White Star Line aboard the RMS Cedric. In 1906, he returned to the Cunard Line serving again on the Campania.

Aboard the Titanic

Crossing and collision 
Frederick Barrett was a lead stoker working in boiler room 6 when Titanic struck an iceberg on the night of 14 April 1912. Boiler room 6 was at the site of the impact with the iceberg.

Barrett was talking to the second engineer John Henry Hesketh, when the red light and bells came on signalling the order to stop the engines. He shouted to the men in the boiler room to shut the dampers, the doors to the furnaces and to shut off the wind for the fires. Then he felt a crash and water came pouring in on him from a large tear in the ship's starboard side. Barrett made his way through the watertight door into boiler room 5. He was ordered to go back into boiler room 6, but there was 8 feet of water there. As some of the engineers attended the pumps, the engine room rang for all the stokers to go up on deck. Barrett was ordered to stay behind by an engineer, Mr. Harvey, in boiler room 5 to get some lamps, draw fires, and lift the manhole plate until water started to rush in.

Aboard lifeboat 13 
Barrett went up along a hatchway to reach the starboard side of A Deck where there were only two lifeboats left. He escaped the sinking ship on lifeboat 13, which was filled with about 65 or 70 people. Lifeboat 15 nearly came down on top of their lifeboat, but they got out in time. He was put in charge of the lifeboat for about an hour, until he got cold and had to let someone else take over. At one point a woman put a cloak over him, and he was unable to remember anything that took place after that in the lifeboat.

Commissions of inquiry, career continuation and end of life 
After the sinking, he testified at both the British Titanic inquiry and United States Senate inquiry into the sinking of the RMS Titanic.

On 25 May 1912, just a few weeks after the sinking, Barrett was working on Titanics sister ship  where he was questioned by Senator William Alden Smith as part of an investigation.
Barrett died in Liverpool on 3 March 1931 due to tuberculosis.

Frederick William Barrett 
Barrett is not to be confused with fellow crewmember, stoker Frederick William Barrett, born in 1879, who perished in the sinking.

Portrayals 
 Maurice Roëves (1979) (S.O.S. Titanic)
 Derek Lea (1997) (Titanic) 
 Phil Cheadle (2011) "What Sank Titanic" Curiosity (TV series)
 Ciarán McMenamin (2012) (Saving the Titanic) 
 Brian d'Arcy James (1997) (Titanic (musical))
 Ken (2017) (Titanic (musical))
 Niall Sheehy (2018) (Europe tour)
 Matt deKort (2019) (Grand Theatre)

Notes 

1883 births
1931 deaths
RMS Titanic survivors
People from Liverpool
20th-century deaths from tuberculosis
Tuberculosis deaths in England